Hong Da-bin (born January 1, 1993), better known by his stage name DPR Live, is a South Korean rapper and singer. Along with Ian, Cream, and REM, Hong co-founded the label Dream Perfect Regime—all of whom attach the label's acronym "DPR" to their names. He released his debut EP, Coming to You Live, on March 15, 2017. He then released his second EP Her on December 7, 2017, followed by his debut studio album Is Anybody Out There? on March 3, 2020. His third EP Iite Cool was released on July 23, 2021.

Personal life 
Hong Da-bin was born in Seoul on January 1, 1993, and was raised in Guam. According to his song “To Whoever” he left Guam for Korea in February 2007. He planned to pursue his higher education in psychology and philosophy in college before considering music but his perspective changed after he attended his mandatory military service in South Korea, where "he found inspiration to go after his dream." He began writing during that period of time and continued to do so, which led him to grow "into a natural passion for music".

Discography

Studio albums

Extended plays

Singles

Music videos

Concert tours
Coming To You Live Tour (2018)
The Regime World Tour (2022)

References

External links

 

1993 births
Living people
Rappers from Seoul
South Korean male rappers
South Korean hip hop singers
South Korean male songwriters
21st-century rappers
21st-century South Korean male singers